John Strick Jr. (May 23, 1921–September 30, 2009) was an American politician who served two terms in the Kansas State Senate from 1985 to 1992. He served 27 years as a pilot for the Naval Air Corps and the Naval Reserves, making commander in the latter part of his career. He had management positions in a number of industries and was a  commercial pilot for Trans World Airlines.

Biography
John Strick Jr. was born on in Kansas City, Kansas to John H. and Veronica (nee Kancelarysty) Strick. He graduated from Kansas State University.

Strick served as a pilot for the Naval Air Corps and the Naval Reserves for 27 years. He retired as a commander. He was employed as a project director and central relocation director at the Urban Renewal Agency of Kansas City, Kansas; sales manager at Fordyce Concrete; general manager of Stewart Sand and Material Company; assistant district traffic and sales manager for Continental Air Lines; and as a commercial pilot for Trans World Airlines.

Strick married Elizabeth R. Macan and together they had four children: John, Gregory, Marion, and Mary. Strick died on September 30, 2009, at Kansas City Hospice House and was buried at Mt. Calvary Cemetery Mausoleum, Kansas City, Kansas.

References

1921 births
2009 deaths
Democratic Party Kansas state senators
20th-century American politicians
Politicians from Kansas City, Kansas